A huerta or horta, from Latin hortus, "garden", is an irrigated area, or a field within such an area, common in Spain and Portugal, where a variety of vegetables and fruit trees are cultivated for family consumption and sale. Typically, individual huertas belong to different people; they are located around rivers or other water sources because of the amount of water required, which is usually provided through small canals (acequias). They are a kind of market garden.

Alternate definitions
Elinor Ostrom has defined huertas as "well-demarked irrigation areas surrounding or near towns" (emphasis added).

See also
 Acequia
 Irrigation district
 Horta of Valencia

References

Bibliography
 Glick, Thomas F. 1970. Irrigation and Society in Medieval Valencia. Cambridge, MA: Harvard University Press. 
 Maass, Arthur, and Raymond Lloyd Anderson. 1978. ...and the Desert Shall Rejoice: Conflict, Growth and Justice in Arid Environments. Cambridge, MA: MIT Press. 
 Ostrom, Elinor (2015 [1990]). "Huerta Irrigation Institutions." Pp.69-82 in Governing the Commons: The Evolution of Institutions for Collective Action. Cambridge, UK: Cambridge University Press. 

Agriculture in Spain
Irrigation in Spain
Landforms
Geography of the Region of Murcia
Geography of the Valencian Community

fr:Jardin_potager
gl:Horta
it:Orto (agricoltura)
pl:Huerta
pt:Horta (agricultura)
qu:Muya
scn:Ortu